Popoff is a surname. It may refer to:

 A. Jay Popoff and Jeremy Popoff, of American band Lit from 1988
 Alicia Popoff (1950–2015), Canadian abstract painter
 Frank Popoff (born 1935), Bulgarian American businessman
 Martin Popoff (born 1963), Canadian music journalist, critic, and author
 Peter Popoff (born 1946), German-born American faith healer, fraudster, and televangelist

See also

Popov, a variant spelling